The 2001 Belgian Supercup was a football match between the winners of the previous season's Belgian First Division and Belgian Cup competitions. The match was contested by Cup winners Westerlo, and 2000–01 Belgian First Division champions, Anderlecht on 4 August 2001 at the ground of the cup winners Westerlo, Het Kuipje.

In an animated match, the home team took an early lead through Francis Severeyns and looked on their way to an easy win as after twenty minutes played Anderlecht was down to ten men following a red card for Aruna Dindane. In the second half however, Anderlecht managed to score four goals to win the cup despite being a man down, including a hattrick by Seol Ki-hyeon.

Details

See also
2000–01 Belgian First Division
2000–01 Belgian Cup

References

Belgian Super Cup, 2001
Belgian Supercup
R.S.C. Anderlecht matches
K.V.C. Westerlo
Belgian Super Cup